Praptham is a 1971 Indian Tamil-language film, directed and produced by Savitri. The film stars Sivaji Ganesan and Savitri. It is a remake of the 1964 Telugu film Mooga Manasulu. The film was released on 14 July 1971, and became a box-office bomb, causing a massive impediment in Savitri's career and leading to her downfall.

Plot

Cast 
Sivaji Ganesan as Kannan
Savitri as Radha
S. V. Ranga Rao as Zamindar
M. N. Nambiar as Raju
Srikanth as Ramu/Thiyagarajan
Chandrakala as Gowri
Nagesh as Ponnan
C. K. Saraswathi as Rama
Senthamarai as Church father
S.R. Janaki as Kannan's mother

Production 
After watching Mooga Manasulu, Savitri wanted to remake it in Tamil, produce it and direct it. Gemini Ganesan, then romantically linked to her, warned her against doing so, describing it as an acid test, but Savitri refused to comply. Besides directing and producing, Savitri also was the lead actress, over Ganesan's objections. The film was mostly shot on an island between Kakinada and Amalapuram.

Soundtrack 
The music was composed by M. S. Viswanathan, with lyrics by Kannadasan.

Release and reception 
Praptham was released on 14 April 1971, Puthandu and became a box-office bomb, partly due to releasing on the same day as another Sivaji Ganesan film, Sumathi En Sundari. It caused a massive impediment in Savitri's career and led to her downfall.

References

External links 
 

1970s Tamil-language films
1971 films
Films scored by M. S. Viswanathan
Tamil remakes of Telugu films